Northlandz is a model railroad layout and museum located near Flemington, New Jersey, built by Bruce Williams Zaccagnino.

History

An eleven-minute short documentary film, Some Kind of Quest, documents the origins of the site. 

When Zaccagnino retired the premises changed hands and were almost demolished. However, the new owner, Tariq Sohail, marveled by the layout's spectacular details and scenery, ultimately decided to retain it. The renovated site opened in October 2019.

References

Inline citations

General references

External links
 

Model railroads
Museums in Hunterdon County, New Jersey
Railroad museums in New Jersey
Flemington, New Jersey
Doll museums
Roadside attractions in New Jersey
1972 establishments in New Jersey